Jean-Marie Conz (born 12 September 1953) is a Swiss retired football defender and later manager.

Honours
Swiss Super League:
Winner: 1985–86
Swiss Super Cup:
Winner: 1986
Swiss Cup:
Winner (2): 1976–77, 1986–87

References

1953 births
Living people
Swiss men's footballers
Switzerland international footballers
Association football defenders
BSC Young Boys players
SR Delémont players
Swiss Super League players
Swiss football managers
SR Delémont managers
BSC Young Boys managers